Loqman may refer to:
 Loqman, East Azerbaijan
 Loqman, Sistan and Baluchestan